West Kowloon Waterfront Promenade is a promenade running alongside Victoria Harbour on reclaimed land in Tsim Sha Tsui on the Kowloon peninsula of Hong Kong. It opened to the public on 17September 2005.

The promenade starts at the junction of Nga Cheung Road and Austin Road West, outside the toll gate leading to the Western Harbour Crossing.

As the West Kowloon Cultural District project has remained stagnant after a long debate, the Hong Kong Government constructed a promenade on unused reclamed land. The promenade is decorated with pillars of wind chimes and illuminated paintings as well as calligraphy invarious styles.

Specialties

Timber Boardwalk
The  section along the shore is covered with wooden strips made from construction waste.

Dragon of Lanterns
Wind chimes are hung at the top of the lighting towers.

See also
 Freespace Fest

References

Urban public parks and gardens in Hong Kong
West Kowloon